Franconia is an unincorporated community in Franconia Township in Montgomery County, Pennsylvania, United States. Franconia is located at the intersection of Pennsylvania Route 113 and Allentown Road.

Franconia opened its first Elementary School in December 1941. Franconia Elementary celebrated their 75th anniversary on October 6, 2016. Students of past and present were welcomed back to share the event with ever-growing community. At the 75th anniversary, the time capsule was opened, where many memories of the past students was shared and presented.

The village is named after Franconia, the English (and Latin) term for Franken, a region in Germany.

Notable people

Samuel Gottschall, fraktur artist

References

Unincorporated communities in Montgomery County, Pennsylvania
Unincorporated communities in Pennsylvania